Homenaje a Chalino Sánchez (Eng.: Homage to Chalino Sánchez') is the title of a studio album released by Regional Mexican artist Jessie Morales as El Original de la Sierra on June 12, 2001. This album became his first number-one hit on the Billboard Top Latin Albums chart. It is a tribute album to the late mexican singer-songwriter Chalino Sánchez.

Track listing
This information from Billboard.com and Allmusic.
Homenaje a Chalino Sánchez (Jessie Morales) – 3:29
Gallo de Sinaloa (Chalino Sánchez) – 3:18
El Melón – 2:46
Rafael Villareal (Chalino Sánchez) – 3:05
Bandido Generoso (Chalino Sánchez) – 3:11
Anastacio Pacheco (Chalino Sánchez) – 3:35
Mi Compa Chalino (Hernández/Reyes) – 2:24
El Original (Jessie Morales) – 2:36
Jorge Casares (feat. El Jilguero) (Chalino Sánchez) – 2:39
Florita del Alma (Jesús Cabral) – 3:32
Nieves de Enero (Mario Molina Montes) – 3:14
Alma Enamorada (performed by Chalino Sánchez) (Rafael Elizondo) – 2:17

Chart performance

Sales and certifications

References

2001 albums
Jessie Morales albums
Universal Music Mexico albums
Tribute albums